Saghar Nizami (1905–1983), also known as Samad Yar Khan, was an Indian poet and writer of ghazal and nazm in Urdu. He was one of the earliest disciples of Seemab Akbarabadi (1882–1951) and was a recipient of the third highest Indian honour of the Padma Bhushan, in 1969, for his contributions to literature.

Biography
Saghar Nizami was born in Aligarh on 21 December 1905. His father, Sardar Ahmed Yar Khan, was a medical doctor in the service of the British government of India. He was a recipient of the Padma Bhushan Award (1969) and the Ghalib Award (1982).

Literary career
From 1923 to 1932 he edited Paimana, a monthly magazine published by his teacher in Agra. In 1933 he shifted to Meerut and founded Adabi Markaz, a publishing house which, in its very first year of operation, introduced Mehr Lal Soni Zia Fatehabadi to the Urdu literary world by publishing Tullu (Dawn), the latter's first collection of poems. Years later, Yusuf Hussain, Editor of Nairang e Khayal was to class Ahsan Danish, Saghar Nizami and Mehr Lal Soni Zia Fatehabadi as the three bright stars (of Urdu poetry) of the modern era.

During his lifetime he published six collections of ghazals and nazms: Subuhi (1934), Badah e mashriq (1934), Kahkashaan (1934), Rangmahal (1943), Mauj e saahil (1949) and Nehrunama (1967). His collected works, Kuliat e Saghar Nizami, were published in three volumes by Modern Publishing House, Delhi between 1999 and 2001.

An appraisal of the works, life and personality of Saghar Nizami titled - Saghar Nizami — Fan aur shakhsiyat ma'a kalam written by Zamir Ali Khan was published in 1985; this book also contains his selected ghazals and nazms. In his article titled Two Anarkalis: Saghar Nizami’s Dream Drama and the Deconstruction of the Parsi Theatre Afroz Taj compares Nizami's play Anarkali to the earlier play of the same name by Imtiyaz Ali Taj.

Just as Kundan Lal Saigal had done for Seemab Akbarabadi so did Master Madan (1923–1942) by singing Yoon na reh reh kar hamen tersaaiye and Hairat se tak raha hai jahan e wafa mujhe, the two ghazals written by Saghar Nizami, made Saghar Nizami well known; the music for these ghazals was composed by Pandit Amarnath.

Bibliography
 Subuhi (1934)
 Badah e Mashriq (1934)
 Kahkashaan (1934)
 Rangmahal (1943)
 Mauj e saahil (1949)
 Nehrunama (1967)

References

Urdu-language poets from India
1905 births
1983 deaths
20th-century Indian Muslims
Muslim poets
People from Aligarh
20th-century Indian poets
Recipients of the Padma Bhushan in literature & education
Indian male poets
Poets from Uttar Pradesh
20th-century Indian male writers